Putnam County Business Park is a commercial development area located in Palatka, Florida. The 257-acre site borders Palatka Municipal Airport and is in close proximity to Putnam Community Medical Center and St. Johns River State College. The business center is owned by Putnam County and Putnam County Port Authority. Alorica was the only tenant occupying the park until it closed in 2015. The telecommunications and business solutions company operated a call center on the property. The former Alorica call center building is for lease.  Other sites are shovel ready.

References

Labor Report: Putnam County Business Park archived at Cornerstone Regional Development Partnership

Business parks of the United States
Buildings and structures in Putnam County, Florida
Palatka, Florida